The Regius Chair of Ecclesiastical History at the University of Oxford was founded by Queen Victoria in 1842. Previous Holders of the chair include John McManners, Peter Hinchliff and Henry Mayr-Harting.

The current Regius Professor of Ecclesiastical History is Sarah Foot (from Michaelmas 2007). She is also a Canon of Christ Church, Oxford.

Professors

1842 Robert Hussey, first holder
1856 Arthur Penrhyn Stanley
1863–1866 Walter Waddington Shirley
1866 Henry Longueville Mansel
1868–1901 William Bright
1901–1908 Charles Bigg
Edward William Watson
1934 Claude Jenkins
1960–1972 Stanley Lawrence Greenslade
1972–1984 John McManners
1992–1995 Peter Hinchliff
1997–2003 Henry Mayr-Harting
2007– Sarah Foot

Notes

Ecclesiastical History, Regius
Ecclesiastical History, Oxford
Ecclesiastical History, Regius, Oxford
1842 establishments in England
Christ Church, Oxford
Lists of historians
Lists of people associated with the University of Oxford